B. Cherlopalli is a village in Prakasam district and Padaaraveedu Mandall, Andhra Pradesh, India. In B. Cherlopalli B stands for Badveedu which is a nearby village and it is the major panchayathi for five villages.

References 

Villages in Prakasam district